CHEM-DT is the TVA owned-and-operated television station in Trois-Rivières, Quebec, Canada. It broadcasts a high-definition digital signal on VHF channel 8 from a transmitter on Rue Principale in Notre-Dame-du-Mont-Carmel.

Owned by the Groupe TVA subsidiary of Quebecor Media, its studios are located on Boulevard de Chanoine-Moreau and Rue Jacques de Labadie in Trois-Rivières. This station can also be seen on Cogeco Cable channel 7 and in high definition on digital channel 503.

History
The station was founded on August 29, 1976 and was owned by Telemedia. It was originally a semi-satellite of CHLT-TV in Sherbrooke, and has been a TVA station for its entire existence. Pathonic Communications bought CHEM and four other stations in 1979. Sometime in the 1980s, CHEM severed the electronic umbilical cord with CHLT and became a full-fledged station. Télé-Metropole, owner of TVA flagship station CFTM-TV in Montreal, bought Pathonic in 1989, and since then CHEM has essentially been a semi-satellite of CFTM.

External links
TVA Trois-Rivières

HEM
HEM
Television channels and stations established in 1976
1976 establishments in Quebec